Stranorlar railway station served the village of Stranorlar in County Donegal, Ireland.

The station opened on 3 September 1863 on the Finn Valley Railway line from Strabane to Stranorlar.

The later railway extensions to Donegal by the West Donegal Railway and via Fintown railway station to Glenties by the Donegal Railway Company.

Stranorlar became the headquarters of the successor company, the County Donegal Railways Joint Committee.

It closed to passenger services on 31 December 1959. Goods trains continued to run between Stranorlar and Strabane until 6 February 1960

References

Disused railway stations in County Donegal
Railway stations opened in 1863
Railway stations closed in 1960